Pam Allyn (born January 31, 1963) is an American literacy expert and author. She is the Senior Vice-president for Innovation at Scholastic Education. She is the founder of LitWorld, a global literacy initiative serving children across the United States and in more than 60 countries. She is also the founder of LitLife, a consulting group working with schools to enrich best practice teaching methods and building curriculum for reading and writing. She is the author of the Your Child's Writing Life (Penguin Avery), Pam Allyn's Best Books for Boys: How To Engage Boys in Reading in Ways That Will Change Their Lives (Scholastic), What To Read When: The Books and Stories To Read With Your Child–And All The Best Times To Read Them (Penguin Avery), and Core Ready, a 14-book series focusing on the Common Core Learning Standards (Pearson). Allyn is widely known as a motivational speaker advocating for reading and writing as human rights that belong to all people. Her personal quest to bring literacy to every child stems from a deeper desire to bring dignity to every child, and to empower children to read and write powerfully, effectively and with passion in ways that will change their worlds and the worlds of others. Her work has been featured on Good Morning America, The Today Show, Oprah Radio, The Huffington Post, CNN International, and in The New York Times. Allyn is the Global Ambassador for Scholastic's "Read Every Day. Lead a Better Life." Campaign. She is also a spokesperson for BIC Kids, championing BIC's 2014 "Fight For Your Write" campaign.

LitLife and LitWorld
LitLife, founded in 2002, works with charter and public schools throughout the United States and Latin America conducting teacher training, professional development, curriculum design and content review to improve reading and writing programs. LitLife's main focus is consulting in schools, building flexible frameworks that are both standards-based and outcome-driven. Developing strategic plans for literacy achievement at all grades K-12, LitLife seeks to help students exceed national learning standards. LitLife's main headquarters is in New York, New York. There are also LitLife branches in New Jersey, Connecticut, Arizona, Chicago and Mexico. LitLife's work is conducted through consultants working directly with teachers and school staff, through Pam Allyn and Team Leaders conducting seminars and giving keynote addresses at select conferences, and through the "Core Ready" series of books, published by Pearson in 2013.

As a response to the fact that, worldwide, at least 793 million people remain illiterate (two-thirds of them being women), LitWorld was founded in 2008 to cultivate global literacy leaders through transformational literacy experiences that build connection, understanding, resilience and strength. LitWorld programs are designed to build self-confidence, promote leadership, and strengthen children and their communities. LitWorld's LitClub and LitCamp programs cultivate a new generation of leaders, storytellers and academic achievers, effecting change for themselves, their community, and their world. LitWorld programs are currently running in the United States, the Philippines, Iraq, Israel, Kenya, and Ghana. LitWorld's work centers on three pillars: Education, Advocacy, and Innovation. In 2010, LitWorld established World Read Aloud Day, an advocacy day that asserts the right to read and write for all people. World Read Aloud Day has reached people in 65 countries and all 50 states. In 2011, LitWorld launched Stand Up for Girls, a worldwide rally in recognition of the International Day of the Girl. LitWorld works towards achieving global literacy by creating thoughtful programs that can be replicated by communities worldwide.

Authorship
Allyn is the author of What to Read When, a book for parents, teachers, and caregivers, published by Avery Publishing, a Member of Penguin Group (USA), in 2009. What to Read When was a finalist for the Library Journal's Book of the Year 2009, has won the 2009 Gold Award from the National Parenting Publications Association, and has been featured across the country on radio and television programs, in publications, and throughout the blogosphere.

Her first professional book, The Complete 4: How to Teach Reading and Writing Through Daily Lessons, Monthly Units and Yearlong Calendars, was published by Scholastic in 2007. This was followed by Allyn's series of grade level books for the K-5 classroom, The Complete Year in Reading and Writing, published by Scholastic in 2008 and co-authored with her LitLife colleagues. Focusing on four essentials of reading and writing - process, genre, strategy and conventions - the books provide an entire year of monthly units of study, including daily lessons that offer exemplary teaching and continuous assessment framework.

Allyn has also written Your Child's Writing Life: How to Inspire Confidence, Creativity, and Skill at Every Age, which is a resource to help parents foster a love of writing in their child's life. The book is based on educational research that claims that writing is just as necessary to a child's development as reading. In the book, Allyn offers the "five keys" to help kids W.R.I.T.E.: Word Power, Ritual, Independence, Time, and Environment.

The Great Eight: Management Strategies for the Reading and Writing Classroom, by Allyn, Jaime Margolies, and Karen McNally, offers management tools that are meant to engage students in learning and achievement.

The Core Ready Series, written by Allyn and published by Pearson, provides educators with critical tools for navigating the Common Core Learning Standards effectively and successfully into the classroom. Allyn condenses the dense concepts of the standards into manageable, practical lessons for everyday instruction. The series is organized around Allyn's Four Doors to Core Ready - The Journey to Meaning: Comprehension and Critique, The Shape of Story: Yesterday and Today, The Road to Knowledge: Information and Research, and The Power to Persuade: Opinion and Argument - and is now available for grades K-2 and 3-5 (the 6-8 books will be published winter 2014).

Social responsibility and outreach
Allyn founded the program Books for Boys in 1999 at The Children's Village, the nation's largest residential treatment center for foster care children. This program has been acclaimed for its innovative efforts on behalf of at-risk boys, and its work is replicated in other foster care agencies. Allyn created the Family Story Power Project in 2008, which brings literacy-rich curriculum and reading and writing opportunities to families and children.

Allyn is a children's rights activist who claims that literacy is a most important vehicle used to promote children's advocacy. According to Allyn, "Reading is like breathing in and writing is like breathing out, and storytelling is what links both: it is the soul of literacy. The most powerful tool that we have to strengthen literacy is often the most underused and overlooked, and that is a child's own stories."

Selected awards and board memberships
Allyn received the James Patterson PageTurner Award for excellence in bringing literacy to underserved populations and has also received a Disney Points of Light Foundation Award for her work bringing books and literacy to children. In May 2007 The Children's Village presented Allyn with its Legacy of Service Award for bringing books and reading to children.

Allyn received the 2013 Literacy Champion Award from Scholastic in September 2013.

Allyn is on the Advisory Boards of the Amherst College Center for Community Engagement, James Patterson's ReadKiddoRead, Penguin Publishing's We Give Books and the Millennium Cities Initiative Social Sector. She is also the Global Ambassador for Scholastic's "Read Every Day. Lead a Better Life." Campaign.

In 2014, Allyn was named a W. K. Kellogg Foundation Fellow and for the next three years will be working with a team of people to explore and develop methods for promoting racial harmony in the United States.

Selected articles
 "Why Poetry Matters" (4/21/2014). Huffington Post
 "Read Aloud. Change the World." (3/3/2014). Huffington Post
 "A global movement powered by the mighty read aloud" (2/27/2014). Scholastic On Our Minds Blog
 "Let's Make 2014 the Year of the Child" (12/23/2013). Huffington Post
 "5 Transformational Family Resolutions for the New Year" (12/20/2013). Psychology Today
 "Obama's Purple Crayon" (12/9/2013). The New York Times
 "The Promise of the Yellow School Bus" (12/9/2013). Huffington Post
 "Where the Wild Things Are Turns 50: The Child's Journey, the Memory of JFK and What Sendak Taught Us" (12/2/2013). Huffington Post
 "5 Ways to Help Kids Live Lives of Gratitude" (11/27/2013). Huffington Post
 "Stand Up for Girls Today: We Are Each Other's Strength" (10/11/2013). Huffington Post
 "Raising a Reader: Learning Empathy" (9/30/2013). Psychology Today
 "Teaching Core Ready Writers: Top Ten Tips for Teaching Students to Write Well" with Debbie Lera (9/17/2013). Pearson Research & Innovation Network
 "A Back to School Call to Action: Let's Have Malala Day Every Day" (8/26/2013). Huffington Post
 "Voices and Choices: The Secrets to Summer Reading and Writing Success" (7/26/2013). Huffington Post
 "10 Ways to Raise a Happy Child" (7/1/2013). Psychology Today

Selected press and media appearances
 "Pam Allyn on the Importance of Girls' Education" (4/30/2014). CNN International
 "LitWorld Founder Pam Allyn on the State of Literacy in the United States" (4/15/2014). Al Jazeera Live
 "The Power of Reading Aloud: MCI Girls' LitClubs in Kenya and Ghana Celebrate 'World Read Aloud Day'" (4/3/2014). Millennium Cities Initiative, a project of the Earth Institute, Columbia University
 "Bush Institute expands women's leadership program in the Middle East" (3/7/2014). Tom Benning, Dallas News
 "Video: NYPD Chief Bill Bratton Reads to Children" (3/6/2014). Kelly Weill, New York Observer
 "Why World Read Aloud Day is my favorite holiday" (3/5/2014). Ron Charles, The Washington Post
 "An Interview with LitWorld Founder Pam Allyn" (3/4/2014). NBC News 4 New York
 "Reading Aloud is 'Simple, Cheap' Way to Fight Illiteracy, Advocates Say" (3/4/2014). Allie Bidwell, U.S. News & World Report
 "Interview with the 2013 Literacy Champion" (10/24/2013). Sophie Murray-Morris, Reading for London
 "Ten Innovative NGOs in Education" (8/13/2013). Emily Schirvar, American University School of International Service
 "Not Vacation: Summer Learning Programs Crucial" (8/10/2013). Philip Elliott, Associated Press
 "From Detroit To Manila, Literacy Is A Life Raft to Independence" (8/5/2013). Denise Restauri, Forbes
 "Education's Next Chapter Focuses on Books, Literacy" (7/19/2014). Bloomberg TV, with guests Pam Allyn and Dominique Young
 "Battling the Summer Slide: LitCamp" (7/16/2014). NBC News 4 New York

Education and early work
Allyn received her undergraduate degree from Amherst College and a Masters in Education from Teachers College, Columbia University. She was the Director of Funded Projects for The Teachers College Columbia University Reading and Writing Project where she worked alongside teachers in New York City schools as a coach and literacy leader.

References

External links 
 
 The LitLife Website
 The LitWorld Website
 The What to Read When Website
 Core Ready Website
 Pam Allyn on Penguin Group
 Pam Allyn on Scholastic
 Pam Allyn on Huffington Post
 Pam Allyn on Psychology Today

1963 births
Living people
Amherst College alumni
Teachers College, Columbia University alumni
American education writers